Gabriel Azevedo Mendes (born 30 May 1954 in Miragaia (Porto)), known simply as Gabriel, is a Portuguese retired football right back and manager.

References

External links

1954 births
Living people
Footballers from Porto
Portuguese footballers
Association football defenders
Primeira Liga players
Segunda Divisão players
FC Porto players
Sporting CP footballers
S.C. Covilhã players
Ermesinde S.C. players
Portugal under-21 international footballers
Portugal international footballers
Portuguese football managers
Liga Portugal 2 managers
C.D. Feirense managers